Rahul Sankrityayan (born Kedarnath Pandey; 9 April 1893 – 14 April 1963) was an Indian writer and a polyglot who wrote in Hindi. He played a pivotal role in giving travelogue a 'literary form'. He was one of the most widely travelled scholars of India, spending forty-five years of his life on travels away from his home.

He became a Buddhist monk (Bhikkhu) and eventually became a Marxist. Sankrityayan was an Indian patriot, having been arrested and jailed for three years for his anti-British writings and speeches. He was a polymath and polyglot. The Government of India awarded him the civilian honour of the Padma Bhushan in 1963.

Early Life
He was born as Kedarnath Pandey to a Bhumihar Brahmin family on 9 April 1893 in Pandaha village. His ancestral village was Kanaila Chakrapanpur, Azamgarh district, in Eastern Uttar Pradesh.

Philosophy
Initially, he was a keen follower of Arya Samaj of Swami Dayananda Saraswati. Then Buddhism changed his life. After taking Diksha in Sri Lanka he became Rahul (son of Buddha) also used his gotra (Sankritya) with his name and was finally called “Rahul Sankrityayan”. He lost faith in God's existence but still retained faith in reincarnation. Later he became a Socialist and rejected the concepts of reincarnation and the afterlife. The two volumes of Darshan-Digdarshan, a collected history of the world's philosophy give an indication of his philosophy where the second volume is much dedicated to Dharmakirti's Pramana Vartika. This he discovered in a Tibetan translation from Tibet.

Travels

Sankrityayan's travels took him to different parts of India including Ladakh, Kinnaur, and Kashmir. He also travelled to several other countries including Nepal, Tibet, Sri Lanka, Iran, China, and the former Soviet Union. He spent several years in the Parsa Gadh village in the Saran district in Bihar. The village's entry gate is named "Rahul Gate". While traveling, he mostly used surface transport, and he went to certain countries clandestinely; he entered Tibet as a Buddhist monk. He made several trips to Tibet and brought valuable paintings and Pali and Sanskrit manuscripts back to India.  Most of these were a part of the libraries of Vikramshila and Nalanda Universities. These objects had been taken to Tibet by fleeing Buddhist monks during the twelfth and subsequent centuries when the invading Muslim armies had destroyed universities in India. Some accounts state that Rahul Sankrityayan employed twenty-two mules to bring these materials from Tibet to India. Patna Museum has a special section of these materials in his honor, where a number of these and other items have been displayed.

Books
Sankrityayan understood several languages and dialects, including Hindi, Sanskrit, Pali, Bhojpuri, Magahi, Urdu, Persian, Arabic, Tamil, Kannada, Tibetan, Sinhalese, French and Russian. He was also an Indologist, a Marxist theoretician, and a creative writer. He started writing during his twenties and his works, totaling well over 100, covered a variety of subjects, including sociology, history, philosophy, Buddhism, Tibetology, lexicography, grammar, textual editing, folklore, science, drama, and politics. Many of these were unpublished. He translated Majjhima Nikaya from Prakrit into Hindi.

One of his Hindi books is Volga Se Ganga (A journey from the Volga to the Ganges) – a work of historical fiction concerning the migration of Aryans from the steppes of the Eurasia to regions around the Volga river; then their movements across the Hindukush and the Himalayas and the sub-Himalayan regions; and their spread to the Indo-Gangetic plains of the subcontinent of India. The book begins in 6000 BC and ends in 1942, the year when Mahatma Gandhi, the Indian nationalist leader called for the Quit India movement. It was published in 1942. A translation into English of this work by Victor Kiernan was published in 1947 as From Volga to Ganga. 

His travelogue literature includes:
Tibbat Me Sava Varsha (1933)
Meri Europe Yatra (1935)
Athato Ghumakkad Jigyasa
Volga Se Ganga
Asia ke Durgam Bhukhando Mein
Yatra Ke Panne
Kinnar Desh Mein

More than ten of his books have been translated and published in Bengali. He was awarded the Padmabhushan in 1963, and he received the Sahitya Akademi Award in 1958 for his book Madhya Asia Ka Itihaas.

Personal life and family

Rahul was married when very young and never came to know anything of his child-wife, Santoshi. Probably he saw her only once in his 40s as per his autobiography: Meri Jivan Yatra. During his stay in Soviet Russia a second time, accepting an invitation for teaching Buddhism at Leningrad University, he came in contact with a Mongolian scholar Lola (Ellena Narvertovna Kozerovskaya). She could speak French, English, and Russian and write Sanskrit. She helped him in working on Tibetan- Sanskrit dictionary. Their attachment ended in marriage and the birth of son Igor Rahulovich. Mother and son did not accompany Rahul to India after the completion of his assignment.

Late in life, he married Kamala Sankrityayan, who was an Indian writer, editor and scholar in Hindi and Nepali. They had a daughter Jaya Sankrityayan Parhawk, one son, Jeta. Jeta is a professor of Economics at North Bengal University.

Death
Rahul accepted a teaching job at a Sri Lankan university, where he fell seriously ill with diabetes, high blood pressure and a mild stroke. He died in Darjeeling in 1963.

Eponymous awards

Works

In Hindi 
Novels
 Baaeesween Sadi – 1923
 Jeeney ke Liye – 1940
 Simha Senapathi – 1944
 Jai Yaudheya – 1944
 Bhago Nahin, Duniya ko Badlo – 1944
 Madhur Swapna – 1949
 Rajasthani Ranivas – 1953
 Vismrit Yatri – 1954
 Divodas – 1960
 Vismriti Ke Garbh Me

Short Stories
 Satmi ke Bachche – 1935
 Volga Se Ganga – 1944
 Bahurangi Madhupuri – 1953
 Kanaila ki Katha – 1955–56

Autobiography
 Meri Jivan Yatra I – 1944
 Meri Jivan Yatra II – 1950
 Meri Jivan Yatra III, IV, V – published posthumously

Biography
 Sardar Prithvi Singh – 1955
 Naye Bharat ke Naye Neta (2 volumes) – 1942
 Bachpan ki Smritiyan – 1953
 Ateet se Vartaman (Vol I) – 1953
 Stalin – 1954
 Lenin – 1954
 Karl Marx – 1954
 Mao-Tse-Tung – 1954
 Ghumakkar Swami – 1956
 Mere Asahayog ke Sathi – 1956
 Jinka Main Kritajna – 1956
 Vir Chandrasingh Garhwali – 1956
 Mahamanav Budha – 1956
 Akbar – 1956
 Simhala Ghumakkar Jaivardhan – 1960
 Kaptan Lal – 1961
 Simhal ke Vir Purush – 1961

Some of his other books are:-
 Mansik Gulami
 Rhigvedic Arya
 Ghumakkar Shastra
 Kinnar desh mein
 Darshan Digdarshan
 Dakkhini Hindi ka Vyaakaran
 Puratatv Nibandhawali
 Manava Samaj
 Madhya Asia ka Itihas 
 Samyavad hi Kyon

In Bhojpuri

Plays

 Japaniya Rachhachh
 Des Rachchhak
 Jarmanwā ke hār nihichay
 ī hamār laṛāi'"
 Dhunmum Netā Naiki Duniya Jonk Mehrarun ke DurdasaRelated to Tibetan
 Tibbati Bal-Siksha – 1933
 Pathavali (Vol. 1,2 & 3) – 1933
 Tibbati Vyakaran (Tibetan Grammar) – 1933
 Tibbat May Budh Dharm-1948
 Lhasa ki or Himalaya Parichay Bhag 1 Himalaya Parichay Bhag 2 See also 
 Hindi literature
 List of Indian writers
 Dharmananda Damodar Kosambi
 Bhadant Anand Kausalyayan

 References 

 Further reading 

 Ram Sharan Sharma, Rahul Sankrityayan and Social Change, Indian History Congress, 1993.
 Himalayan Buddhism, Past and Present: Mahapandit Rahul Sankrityayan centenary volume by D. C. Ahir
 Prabhakar Machwe: "Rahul Sankrityayan" New Delhi 1978: Sahitya Akademi. [A short biography including a list of Sankrityayan's works]
 Bharati Puri, Traveller on the Silk Road: Rites and Routes of Passage in Rahul Sankrityayan’s Himalayan Wanderlust, China Report (Sage: New Delhi), February 2011, vol. 47, no. 1, pp. 37–58.
 Alaka Atreya Chudal, A Freethinking Cultural Nationalist: A Life History of Rahul Sankrityayan'', Oxford University Press, 2016.

1893 births
1963 deaths
Bhojpuri-language writers
Hindi-language writers
People from Azamgarh district
Indian Indologists
20th-century Indian translators
20th-century Indian linguists
Indian Marxists
Writers from Uttar Pradesh
Recipients of the Sahitya Akademi Award in Hindi
Recipients of the Padma Bhushan in literature & education
Indian Sanskrit scholars
Tibetologists
Newar studies scholars
Indian travel writers
Prisoners and detainees of British India
Indian male novelists
20th-century Indian biographers
Indian autobiographers
Indian social reformers
20th-century Indian novelists
20th-century Indian short story writers
Scholars from Uttar Pradesh
Indian scholars of Buddhism